True/False Film Fest is an annual documentary film festival that takes place in Columbia, Missouri. The Fest occurs on the first weekend in March (sometimes beginning in late February), with films being shown from Thursday evening to Sunday night. Films are screened at multiple locations around downtown Columbia, including Ragtag Cinema, Jesse Hall, Missouri Theatre Center for the Arts, The Picturehouse, The Blue Note, The Globe, Rhynsburger Theater and the Forrest Theater in the Tiger Hotel.  It offers one award each year, the True Vision Award.

True/False Film Fest and Ragtag Cinema are programs of the 501(c)(3) not-for-profit organization, the Ragtag Film Society. Ragtag Film Society seeks to champion independent film and media art and to serve film communities both locally and globally.

History
True/False was started by Paul Sturtz and David Wilson (who also founded the Ragtag Cinema) in February 2004. In 2006, it won the Riverfront Times best film festival. In 2008, the film fest lost 1,200 seats due to the renovation work taking place at the Missouri Theatre. To adjust for the loss, the fest expanded beyond its usual boundaries in order to take advantage of additional screens at Macklanburg Cinema, Windsor Cinema, and The Den on the campus of Stephens College. After the completion of its restoration, the historic Missouri Theatre was once again a featured venue for the 2009 edition of the fest. The True/False Film Fest and Stephens College amicably ended their partnership after the 2011 fest, and Stephens College continued to host the annual Citizen Jane Film Festival through its demise in 2018.

The 2021 edition of the festival was moved to outdoor venues in nearby Stephens Lake Park due to the COVID-19 pandemic. The event made its return to downtown Columbia setting 2022.

Growth
The first True/False Film Festival in 2004 sold 4,200 tickets and the fest has since experienced rapid growth, increasing attendance by 25% or more in all but two years through its first decade. Since then, the festival has increased attendance each year with the exception of 2014, which saw a 3% decrease amid a winter snowstorm. The latest event in 2017 saw another record high in ticket sales, nearly 3,000 more than 2016.

Over the years, the festival has expanded its presentation of other arts, including music and decorative art. The event kicks off with a parade, the "March March," and ends with "Buskers Last Stand," in which many of the invited musicians come together for a closing performance. It encourages additional attendee involvement through participatory events like the "True Life 5K run," and the "Gimme Truth!" game show. The festival has risen from its meager origins to earn praise from both the Chicago Tribune and Los Angeles Times.

In 2019, the festival received thousands of submissions and sold over 54,000 tickets, bringing thousands of people to mid-Missouri from around the world. The festival is sponsored by almost every downtown store, restaurant and bar, and has multiple educational events such as Camp True/False and BOATS for both local & national high schools, year-long film programs, and more.

Education

Media Literacy Initiative 
In early 2016, Columbia Public Schools, Ragtag Film Society, and the Columbia Public Schools Foundation announced a new, landmark multi-year partnership that brings together film, the CPS curriculum, and teacher training. The Media Literacy initiative is a year-round program that supports teacher efforts to incorporate more film and multimedia into their classrooms.

The program champions the belief that as students catapult into a world of ever-changing media, distribution platforms, and news outlets, the skills to be thoughtful, critical consumers of media must grow. Students deserve the tools to think consciously about the ways their world is presented to them and the ways they present their world. The primary goals are to increase the presence of film in core classrooms, help teachers and students learn to read film as text, and to cultivate and enhance critical thinking skills as teachers and students practice analyzing new media.

Camp True/False 
Camp True/False brings high school students with varying interests insider access to the fest for a weekend of exciting films, music, art, conversations and workshops with a diverse crew of exceptional guests and local hosts. Camp True/False convenes before the Fest to discuss relevant issues, share research and plot their course. Participating students get a chance to meet the founders of the festival and meet with directors of the films showing at the festival in a private, personal manner. The camp is completely free for the students, who are selected through an application process in November. All Columbia Public Schools participate, as well as 10 out-of-town schools (4 of those, out-of-state). In 2019, the camp included around 80 high schoolers, including 30 local students and 50 students from nearby and national areas. Students from Saint Louis, Jefferson City, North Carolina, New Mexico, and more attended the 4 day camp.

DIY Day 
On the Friday morning of the Fest, 10th graders from across all four Columbia public high schools take buses to a True/False venue where their nonfiction cinema & art experience begins! The students watch buskers and a festival film (listed below, by year), and students are encouraged to participate in a Q&A with the filmmaker. Afterward, 200 self-selected students attend interactive artist workshops and join in the anyone-can-join March March parade.

Educational Screening Films 
The Educational Screenings are a special screening for local high school sophomores as a field trip to watch one film from the festival for free. 

2023: Let the Little Light Shine, dir. Kevin Shaw

2022: Step, dir. Amanda Lipitz

2021: Undefeated, dir. Daniel Lindsay and T.J. Martin

2020: The Order of Myths, dir. Margaret Brown

2019: Amazing Grace, guest Dr. King

2018: Won't You Be My Neighbor?, dir. Morgan Neville

2017: I Am Not Your Negro, dir. Raoul Peck

2016: The Bad Kids, dir. Keith Fulton & Lou Pepe

2015: What Happened Miss Simone?, dir. Liz Garbus

2014: Particle Fever, dir. Mark Levinson

2013: Crash Reel dir. Lucy Walker

Films 

True/False includes films by local and international filmmakers, with thousands of films being sent in each year for consideration.

True Vision Award
The True/False Film Fest offers a single award.  The True Vision Award is given annually to the filmmaker, or filmmakers, whose work shows a dedication to the creative advancement of the art of nonfiction filmmaking. Each winner is presented with an original bronze sculpture, created by nationally known Columbia artist Larry Young.

*The newest film presented by the chosen winner in each year's festival.

True Life Fund
Since 2007, the True/False Film Fest has also featured the True Life Fund, a fundraising program which goes to demonstrate that documentaries can create change by offering tangible assistance to the real-life subjects of a new non-fiction film each year. The fund further acknowledges that documentary filmmakers and festivals thrive because of the stories provided by people of often limited means. The True Life Fund is presented by the Crossing (a Missouri church group) and is supported by the Bertha Foundation.

References

External links

Documentary film festivals in the United States
Tourist attractions in Columbia, Missouri
Cinema of Columbia, Missouri
Festivals in Columbia, Missouri
Film festivals in Missouri